Ondontomachini is a tribe of ants which belongs to the subfamily Ponerinae. Ondontomachini includes two genera: Odontomachus and Anochetus.

References

Ponerinae